Paul Hurlston is a Caymanian Olympic javelin thrower. He represented his country in the men's javelin throw at the 1988 Summer Olympics. His distance was a 62.34.

References

1966 births
Living people
Male javelin throwers
Olympic athletes of the Cayman Islands
Athletes (track and field) at the 1988 Summer Olympics
Caymanian male athletes